Phosca Nekesa Kasisi (born 1993) is a Kenyan female volleyball player who plays for Kenya Commercial Bank. She is in the Kenya women's national volleyball team as captain of the beach volleyball team at the postponed 2020 Summer Olympics in Tokyo. Kenya has never had a beach volleyball team at the Olympics.

Life
Kasisi was born in 1993 in Nairobi.

Kasisi became captain of the beach volleyball team. The team gained Kenya qualification for the postponed 2020 Summer Olympics with Kasisi, Brackcides Agala, Yvonne Wavinya and Gaudencia Makokha. They qualified when they won at the African Continental Cup Finals in Morocco in 2021. She and Wavinga beat the Nigerian pair of Tochukwu Nnoruga and Albertina Francis 2-0 while Agala and Makokha beat Francisca Ikhiede and Amara Uchechukwu 2–1.

Kenya's beach volleyballers were in the four Continental Cup winners with Argentina, Cuba and China (who had already gained Olympic qualification). Kenya has never had a beach volleyball team at the Olympics.
The four players who qualified will make up Kenya's Olympic beach volleyball team chosen by the coach Sammy Mulinge.

Clubs
  Kenya Commercial Bank

References

1996 births
Living people
Kenyan women's volleyball players
People from Makueni County